Dashenko Adriano Ricardo (born March 1, 1990) is a Dutch professional baseball catcher for Curaçao Neptunus of the Honkbal Hoofdklasse. He played for Team Netherlands in the 2019 European Baseball Championship, and at the Africa/Europe 2020 Olympic Qualification tournament in Italy in September 2019.

Career

Baltimore Orioles
Ricardo was signed as an undrafted free agent by the Baltimore Orioles in 2007. He made his professional debut in 2007 with the Dominican Summer League Orioles. In 2008, he played for the rookie ball GCL Orioles, slashing .169/.199/.199 in 39 games. In 2009, Ricardo played for the rookie ball Bluefield Orioles and the Single-A Delmarva Shorebirds, hitting .234/.266/.304 between the two teams. He split the 2010 season between Bluefield and the Low-A Aberdeen IronBirds, batting .187/.230/.262 with 1 home run and 6 RBI.

San Francisco Giants
The San Francisco Giants selected Ricardo in the minor league phase of the Rule 5 draft after the 2010 season. He pitched for the Arizona League Giants in 2011, recording a 9.00 ERA in 3 appearances. In 2012, Ricardo hit for the Low-A Salem-Keizer Volcanoes, slashing .253/.268/.333 with 2 home runs and 17 RBI. On January 24, 2013, Ricardo was released by the Giants organization.

Los Angeles Dodgers
Ricardo signed a minor league contract with the Los Angeles Dodgers on March 17, 2013. He bounced around the Dodgers system, appearing in 26 games for Class-A Great Lakes, 9 for AA Chattanooga and 2 for AAA Albuquerque. On March 9, 2014, Ricardo was released by the Dodgers organization.

Corendon Kinheim
On March 27, 2014, Ricardo signed with the Corendon Kinheim of the Honkbal Hoofdklasse. He hit .266/.307/.424 with 3 home runs and 28 RBI in 2014. Ricardo greatly improved in 2015, slashing .420/.441/.609 with 4 home runs and a career-high 40 RBI in 42 games.

Curaçao Neptunus
On November 2, 2015, Ricardo joined the Curaçao Neptunus of the Honkbal Hoofdklasse for the 2016 season. In 25 games for the team, he hit .404/.448/.543. On June 7, 2016, Ricardo retired from professional baseball, stating that “he cannot motivate himself anymore to play baseball.”

Lincoln Saltdogs
Ricardo's retirement was short lived as he signed with the Lincoln Saltdogs of the American Association of Independent Professional Baseball on November 2, 2016. In 69 games for Lincoln, Ricardo slashed .270/.309/.371. On January 11, 2018, Ricardo re-signed with Lincoln. Ricardo batted .269/.307/.379 with 5 home runs and 35 RBI in 2018.

Tampa Bay Rays
On December 18, 2018, Ricardo signed with the Sioux Falls Canaries of the American Association of Independent Professional Baseball. On March 22, 2019, Ricardo's contract was sold to the Tampa Bay Rays organization. He spent the year in Triple-A with the Durham Bulls, slashing .171/.211/.314 in 16 games. November 4, 2019, Ricardo elected free agency.

Curaçao Neptunus (second stint)
On December 29, 2019, Ricardo signed with the Gateway Grizzlies of the Frontier League. On July 20, 2020, Ricardo joined the Curaçao Neptunus of the Honkbal Hoofdklasse for the 2020 after the Frontier League season was cancelled due to the COVID-19 pandemic. He hit .271/.325/.386 in 18 games in 2020. On April 29, 2021, Ricardo joined the club for the 2021 season.

International career

He played for Team Netherlands in the 2019 European Baseball Championship, and at the Africa/Europe 2020 Olympic Qualification tournament in Italy in September 2019.

References

External links

1990 births
2013 World Baseball Classic players
2015 WBSC Premier12 players
2016 European Baseball Championship players
2017 World Baseball Classic players
2019 European Baseball Championship players
Aberdeen IronBirds players
Albuquerque Isotopes players
Arizona League Giants players
Baseball catchers
Bluefield Orioles players
Chattanooga Lookouts players
Corendon Kinheim players
Curaçao baseball players
Curaçao expatriate baseball players in the United States
Curacao Neptunus players
Delmarva Shorebirds players
Dominican Summer League Orioles players
Curaçao expatriate baseball players in the Dominican Republic
Great Lakes Loons players
Gulf Coast Orioles players
Living people
People from Willemstad
Salem-Keizer Volcanoes players